The Moreton Bay Region is a local government area in the north of the Brisbane metropolitan city in South East Queensland, Australia. Established in 2008, it replaced three established local government areas, the City of Redcliffe and the Shires of Pine Rivers and Caboolture.

With an estimated operating budget of A$391 million and a 2018 population of 459,585, Moreton Bay Region is the third largest local government area in Australia behind the City of Brisbane and City of Gold Coast, both of which are also amalgamated entities.

History
Duungidjawu (also known as Kabi Kabi, Cabbee, Carbi, Gabi Gabi) is an Australian Aboriginal language spoken on Duungidjawu country. The Duungidjawu language region includes the landscape within the local government boundaries of Somerset Region and Moreton Bay Region, particularly the towns of Caboolture, Kilcoy, Woodford and Moore.

Prior to 2008, the new Moreton Bay Region was an entire area of three previous and distinct local government areas:

 the City of Redcliffe;
 the Shire of Pine Rivers;
 and the Shire of Caboolture.

At the time the Divisional Boards Act 1879 came into force on 11 November 1879, the present Morton Bay Region was entirely contained within the Caboolture Division, which also included the Sunshine Coast. By 1890, Caboolture Division had shrunk considerably with the separate incorporation of the Pine Division (21 January 1888), Redcliffe Division (5 April 1888) and Maroochy Division (5 July 1890).

With the passage of the Local Authorities Act 1902, Caboolture, Pine and Redcliffe (as well as Maroochy) became Shires on 31 March 1903. Redcliffe was proclaimed a Town on 28 May 1921 and a City on 13 June 1959. A few weeks earlier, on 23 May 1959, Pine was renamed the Shire of Pine Rivers.

In July 2007, the Local Government Reform Commission released its report and recommended that the three areas amalgamate. It argued that the area was part of the South East Queensland Regional Plan's Urban Footprint, and would attract 11% of the region's population and housing growth to 2006. A very strong community of interest was identified through the region's links and dependencies to Brisbane. The councils disagreed with the commission's plans although, with the exception of Redcliffe, did not oppose alternative amalgamation options. On 15 March 2008, the City and Shires formally ceased to exist, and elections were held on the same day to elect councillors and a mayor to the Regional Council. In 2012, following the election of the LNP state government, Redcliffe sought to enter a de-amalgamation process; however, a deadline to gather signatures on a petition by 29 August 2012 was missed. The Hills District sought in 2011 to transfer to Brisbane City Council, but the local government Change Commissioner declined the proposal on cost grounds.

On 8 December 2021, the council unanimously voted to rename the council area to Moreton Bay City and to seek approval from the Local Government Change Commission for the renaming .

Divisions and councillors

Moreton Bay Region is divided into 12 divisions, each of which elects one councillor to the Regional Council. Additionally, the entire Region elects a mayor. Allan Sutherland was elected as the Region's first mayor at the 2008 elections, and Peter Flannery as the second Mayor in 2020. The current elected councillors are:

2020 Councillors:

Mayors

 2008–2020: Allan Sutherland
 2020–present: Peter Flannery

Former Mayors and Councillors

Former Mayors and Councillors elected to Moreton Bay Regional Council since 2008.

Mayors:

 Allan Sutherland

Councillors:

 Brian Battersby – Considered one of Queensland longest serving Councillors at the time of his retirement.
 Mike Charlton – Defeated by newcomer Cath Tonks while Deputy & Acting Mayor. 
 Greg Chippendale
 David Dwyer
 Rae Frawley
 Julie Greer
 James Houghton
 Bob Millar
 Gary Parsons
 Adrian Raedel
 Denise Sims – Resigned on 20 October 2021, due to personal health reasons
 Chris Whiting
 Koliana Winchester

Unitywater
On 1 July 2010, Moreton Bay Regional Council's Water Services (along with Sunshine Coast Regional Council), moved over to the recently created water body, Unitywater. Unitywater was created by the Queensland Government as part of the State's takeover of South East Queensland's water facilities, dams and water supply networks. Moreton Bay, Sunshine Coast Regional Council and Noosa Shire Council are joint owners of Unitywater.

Suburbs
The Moreton Bay Region include the following settlements:

Redcliffe area
 Redcliffe
 Clontarf
 Deception Bay
 Kippa-Ring
 Margate
 Newport
 Rothwell
 Scarborough
 Woody Point

Pine Rivers area

Urban suburbs:

 Albany Creek
 Arana Hills
 Bray Park
 Brendale
 Eatons Hill
 Everton Hills
 Ferny Hills
 Griffin

 Kallangur
 Lawnton
 Mango Hill
 Murrumba Downs
 North Lakes
 Petrie
 Strathpine
 Warner

Rural localities:

 Armstrong Creek
 Bunya
 Camp Mountain
 Cashmere
 Cedar Creek
 Clear Mountain
 Closeburn
 Dakabin
 Dayboro
 Draper
 Highvale
 Jollys Lookout
 Joyner
 King Scrub
 Kobble Creek

 Kurwongbah
 Laceys Creek
 Mount Glorious
 Mount Nebo
 Mount Pleasant
 Mount Samson
 Ocean View
 Rush Creek
 Samford Valley
 Samford Village
 Samsonvale
 Whiteside
 Wights Mountain
 Yugar

Caboolture area

Coastal Caboolture region:
 Beachmere
 Bellmere
 Burpengary
 Burpengary East
 Caboolture
 Caboolture South
 Deception Bay
 Donnybrook
 Elimbah
 Godwin Beach
 Meldale
 Moodlu
 Morayfield
 Narangba
 Ningi
 Sandstone Point
 Toorbul
 Upper Caboolture

Inland Caboolture region:
 Bellthorpe
 Booroobin
 Bracalba
 Campbells Pocket
 Cedarton
 Commissioners Flat
 D'Aguilar
 Delaneys Creek
 Moorina
 Mount Delaney
 Mount Mee
 Neurum
 Rocksberg
 Stanmore
 Stony Creek
 Wamuran
 Wamuran Basin
 Woodford

Bribie Island:
 Banksia Beach
 Bellara
 Bongaree
 Bribie Island NP:
 Welsby
 White Patch
 Woorim

Population
The populations given relate to the component entities prior to 2008. The 2011 census was the first for the amalgamated council region.

Demographics

Facilities
The Moreton Bay Regional Council operates libraries at Albany Creek, Arana Hills, Bongaree (Bribie Island), Burpengary, Caboolture, Deception Bay, North Lakes, Redcliffe, Strathpine, and Woodford. It also operates a mobile library service on a fortnightly basis serving the suburbs of Beachmere, Bray Park, Dayboro, Donnybrook, Lawnton, Mount Glorious, Mount Mee, Mount Nebo, Mount Samson Petrie, Samford, Toorbul and Warner.

Local heritage register 
The Moreton Bay Regional Council maintains its local heritage register in two parts:

 List of sites, objects and buildings of significant historical and cultural value
 List of significant trees

References

External links
 Moreton Bay Regional Council
 Moreton City News

 
Local government areas of Queensland
Local government areas in Brisbane
2008 establishments in Australia